Barry Andrew Potomski (November 24, 1972 – May 24, 2011) was a Canadian professional ice hockey right winger.  He played 68 National Hockey League games: 59 with the Los Angeles Kings and 9 with the San Jose Sharks.

Potomski died on May 24, 2011, after collapsing at a fitness centre, Lifestyle Family Fitness in Windsor.

Career statistics

References

External links

1972 births
2011 deaths
Adirondack Red Wings players
Anaheim Bullfrogs players
Canadian ice hockey right wingers
Erie Panthers players
Ice hockey people from Ontario
Sportspeople from Windsor, Ontario
Idaho Steelheads (WCHL) players
Las Vegas Thunder players
London Knights players
Long Beach Ice Dogs (IHL) players
Los Angeles Kings players
Phoenix Roadrunners (IHL) players
San Diego Gulls (WCHL) players
San Jose Sharks players
Toledo Storm players
Undrafted National Hockey League players